SV Resolute was a Colombian schooner that the German submarine U-172 shelled and sank on 23 June 1942 in the Caribbean Sea.

Construction 
Resolute was built as a schooner at an unknown date. Her size and speed are also unknown.

Sinking 
Resolute was stopped by the German submarine U-172 at 17:10 pm on 23 June 1942 in the Caribbean Sea near Saint Andrews and Old Providence. Afterwards the U-boat sank the abandoned vessel with hand grenades and gunfire from her deck gun. The attack and sinking of the Resolute still claimed the lives six of her ten crew members; the four survivors later claimed that they were machine-gunned after having abandoned the ship, but this was apparently a misinterpretation of shots that missed the Resolute.

Wreck 

References

Schooners
Sailing ships
Ships sunk by German submarines in World War II
Maritime incidents in June 1942
World War II shipwrecks in the Caribbean Sea